Thomas Wall may refer to:

 Thomas Wall (theatre founder), founder of the first permanent theatrical company in Baltimore, Maryland
 Thomas Wall (cricketer) (1841–1875), English cricketer
 Thomas Wall (politician) (1840–?), American businessman and politician in Wisconsin

See also
 Tom Wall (disambiguation)